is a single by Japanese boy band Kanjani Eight. It was released on October 15, 2014. It debuted in number one on the weekly Oricon Singles Chart and reached number one on the Billboard Japan Hot 100. It was the 20th best-selling single of the year in Japan, with 308,369 copies.

References 

2014 singles
2014 songs
Japanese film songs
Japanese-language songs
Kanjani Eight songs
Oricon Weekly number-one singles
Billboard Japan Hot 100 number-one singles